Protein Transduction Domain-fused Dishevelled Binding Motif (PTD-DBM) is a man-made peptide which interacts with the mechanism of the hair loss linked endogenous protein, CXXC5, which is a negative feedback regulator of the Wnt/β-catenin pathway. Application of the peptide to bald laboratory mice resulted in new hair follicle growth.

PTD-DBM is a peptide activating the Wnt/β-catenin signaling pathway functioning via interference of the binding of CXXC5 to Dishevelled (Dvl), an upstream component of the Wnt/β-catenin pathway. By topical application, the PTD-DBM promotes the formation of new hair follicles and prevents hair loss. Combinatory treatment of PTD-DBM with valproic acid (VPA), the activator of Wnt/β-catenin pathway, further induce hair re-growth as well as wound-induced hair neogenesis (WIHN). The increased expression of CXXC5 in the bald scalps and excellent effects of PTD-DBM on hair growth in mice raised hopes for the application of this peptide on hair growth in the clinic.

Discovery of PTD-DBM 
Professor Kang-Yell Choi and his research team at Yonsei University in South Korea discovered a protein responsible for hair loss in the condition known as androgenetic alopecia. The responsible protein is called CXXC-type zinc finger protein 5 (CXXC5), which acts as a negative regulator for the Wnt/β-catenin pathway, involved in hair regeneration and wound healing. CXXC5 negatively regulates hair growth, and the researchers developed a new substance that promotes hair regeneration by controlling the function of CXXC5. When CXXC5 binds with the Dvl protein, which functions at the upstream of Wnt/β-catenin pathway, it suppresses hair regrowth and hair follicle neogenesis. The observation of CXXC5 overexpression in the bald scalp by Professor Choi’s team led to the development of PTD-DBM, which interferes with the CXXC5-Dvl protein-protein interaction (PPI). By topical application, PTD-DBM enhances hair regrowth as well as neogenesis. The hair growth promoting effect of PTD-DBM is further enhanced when used in combination with a Wnt/β-catenin signaling activator such as VPA, which is generally used as a drug for bipolar disorder and activates the Wnt/β-catenin pathway by inhibition of GSK3β. Currently, topical application of PTD-DBM or its combination with VPA has been used for treatment of hair loss.

References

External links 

 "Korean Scientists Develop Potential Drug Candidate for Hair Loss" - Business Korea

Peptides